Gankin, feminine form Gankina is a matronymic Jewish surname.

Notable people
Notable people with this surname include:
 Denis Gankin, Kazakhstani archer
 Victor Gankin, Russian-American scientist
 Vitaliy Gankin,  Russian sprint canoer

Matronymic surnames